Lorella Stefanelli (born 20 February 1959) is a Sammarinese politician who was Captain Regent of San Marino from October 2015 until April 2016 (alongside Nicola Renzi).

She is a lawyer and worked in the Sammarinese Department of Tourism. She graduated in law from Bologna University.

References
Ecco i Capitani Reggenti eletti

1959 births
People from the City of San Marino
21st-century women politicians
Captains Regent of San Marino
Members of the Grand and General Council
Female heads of state
Living people
Sammarinese Christian Democratic Party politicians
Sammarinese women in politics
University of Bologna alumni